Indra Soundar Rajan (born 13 November 1958)  is the pen name of P. Soundar Rajan,  a well-known Tamil author of short stories, novels, television serials, and screenplays. He lives in Madurai.

He is something of an expert on South Indian Hindu traditions and mythological lore. He was employed in TVS Group of Companies before becoming a full-time writer. His stories typically deal with cases of supernatural occurrence, divine intervention, reincarnation, ghosts, and are often based on or inspired by true stories reported from various locales around the state of Tamil Nadu.

Two or three of his novels are published every month in publications such as Crime Story and Today Crime News. He has done more than 300 episodes in Podhigai TV program named"Kanchiyin Karunai", which tells the greatness of Shri Chandrasekhara Saraswathi Swamigal, the pontiff of Kanchipuram Shankara mutt.

Selected works

Fiction
Aval Oru Savithri
Sri Puram
 Abaaya Malli
Enge en kannan
Kallukkul Pugundha Uyir
Neelakkal Modhiram
Sornajaalam
Unnai Kaivitamaattaen
Nandi Ragasiyam
Sadhiyai Sandippom
Thevar koyil Roja
Maaya Vizhigal
Maayamaaga Pogiraargal
 Muthu pandhal
Thulli Varuguthu
Naagapanjami
Kan Simittum Ratthinakkal
Thangakkaadu
Kaatru Kaatru Uyir
Thoda Thoda Thangam
Aindhu Vazhi Moondru Vaasal
Ush!
Mahadeva Ragasiyam
Sutri Sutri Varuven
Kattray Varuven
Kottaippuratthu Veedu
Ragaisyamaai Oru Ragasiyam
Sivarahasiyam
Thitti Vaasal Marmam
Vairabommai
Kaadhal Kuttavaali
Krishna Thandhiram
Penmanam
Pen Ulavaali
Jeeva En Jeeva
Sorna Regai
Vittu Vidu Karuppa (Marmadesam - Vidaathu Karuppu)
Iyandira Paravai
Vaanathu Manidhargal
Rudra Veenai, Part 1, 2, 3 & 4
Vikrama Vikrama, Part 1 & 2
Kannigal Ezhupaer
Ayiram Arivaal Kottai
Thedathe Tholaindu Poevaai 1 & 2
Sivamayam, Part 1 & 2
Mandira Viral
Naan Ramasheshan Vanthuruken
Olivatharku Idamillai
Athu Mattum Ragasiyam
Pallavan Pandiyan Baskaran
Melae Uyarae Uchiyilae, Part 1 & 2
Naaga Padai
Mayamai Sillar
Maya Vanam
Ranga neadhi
Appavin Aathma
Sittha Ragasiyam
Katrodu Oru Yuttham
Naaga PADAI
Naaga vanam (YET TO BE RELEASED)
Asura sddas
Sivaragasiyam
Sakthi Raajyam
Sakthi
Chidambara Ragasiyam
Ragasiyam Parama(n) Ragasiyam

Television Serials
Kottai Purathu Veedu, (DD Podhigai)
This serial is adapted in Hindi as Kaal Bhairav - Ek Naya Rahasya and is currently being telecasted on Star Bharat.
Yen Peyar Ranganayaki, (Sun TV)
chithi (sun tv)
Sivamayam, (Sun TV)
Rudra Veenai, Sun TV
Marmadesam , Sun TV, Raj TV
Ragasiyam (Secret): 
Vasanth TV retelecasted this serial in 2016.  
This serial was adapted and aired on Star Bharat as Kaal Bhairav Rahasya and completed its run in 2018.
Vidathu Karuppu (Karuppu Never Spares): 
Vasanth TV retelecasted this serial in 2015.
Sorna Regai (Golden Palmlines)
Iyanthira Paravai (The Mechanical Bird)
Ethuvum Nadhakum (Anything might happen)
Maayavettai
Mandhira Vaasal
Thedathe Tholaindu Povaai
Krishnadasi, Sun TV
This serial was adapted and aired on Colors as Krishnadasi .
Yamirukka Bayamenn (TV series), Vijay TV
Adhu Mattum Ragasiyam, Sun TV
Atthi Pookal, Sun TV
Rudhram, Jaya TV
Puguntha Veedu, Zee Tamil
Nagamma (TV Series), Sun TV
Siva Ragasiyam, Zee Tamil
Ganga (TV Series), Sun TV
Subramaniyapuram (2018 TV Series), Jaya TV

As an actor
Ragasiyam - Journalist Srikanth (Guest Appearance)

Hindi Adaptations
Krishnadasi (2016 TV series) (Colors)
Kaal Bhairav Rahasya, (Star Bharat)
Kaal Bhairav - Ek Naya Rahasya (Star Bharat)

Films
Sringaram (2007)
Anandhapurathu Veedu (2010)
Iruttu (2019)

References

Living people
Tamil-language writers
20th-century Indian novelists
Novelists from Tamil Nadu
Tamil male television actors
1958 births